William Harding may refer to:

Politics
 William Harding (politician) (1835–1903), Australian politician
 William L. Harding (1877–1934), Republican Governor of Iowa from 1917 to 1921, best remembered for the "Babel Proclamation"
 William Neville Harding (1893–1978), Lord Mayor of Sydney

Sports
 William Harding (footballer) (1883–1967), English footballer
 William Harding (sport shooter) (1910–1936), American sports shooter
 Halley Harding (William Claire Halley Harding, 1904–1967), American baseball player and sportswriter

Others
 William Harding (Virginia witch trials) (c. 1625), first person convicted of witchcraft in Virginia Colony
 William Harding (yeoman) (1643–1718), British yeoman and founder of a charity in 1719 to clothe and educate poor children in the hamlet of Walton, Aylesbury
 William Harding (antiquary) (1792–1886), antiquary and British army officer
 William Giles Harding (1808–1886), American heir, Southern planter, horse breeder and Confederate general
 William James Harding (1826–1899), New Zealand photographer
 William P. G. Harding (1864–1930), American banker, former Federal Reserve Chairman
 Ali Eisami (aka William Harding, born 1786/1787), Kanuri man who lived in Sierra Leone

Other uses
 William Harding Combined School in Elm Farm, Aylesbury, England

See also
William Harding Carter (1851–1925), U.S. soldier
William Harding Jackson (1901–1971), Deputy Director of the CIA in the 1950s